State Route 343 (SR 343) is a state highway in Morristown, Hamblen County in the U.S. state of Tennessee. It serves as connector from US 25E into downtown Morristown.

Route description
SR 343 begins at an intersection with US 25E south of Morristown and north of White Pine and is called Old US Highway 25E. It heads north and has an interchange with SR 160 and continues north through a commercial area/retail area and into downtown Morristown. After intersecting with SR 160, SR 343 becomes known as South Cumberland Street. There, SR 343 has an intersection with US 11E and SR 66 at two separate intersections. At the SR 66 intersection, the name changes to North Cumberland Street and then travels north to an intersection where the Cumberland Street designation comes to an end and it becomes Buffalo Trail, the route continues north under this name and ends at US 25E on the north side of Morristown, just  from the Hamblen–Grainger county line.

At the northern terminus there is partial interchange, traffic wanting to go northbound on US 25E from SR 343 must go follow the on ramp and go under US 25E, and traffic coming southbound on US 25E must use the on ramp from southbound US 25E. And for traffic going northbound on US 25E traffic must turn on a short side road called South Cherokee Park Road and for traffic on SR 343 wanting to go southbound US 25E must also use the side road.

Junction list

See also
 
 
 List of state routes in Tennessee

References

343
Transportation in Hamblen County, Tennessee
Morristown, Tennessee